Ülendi is a village in Hiiumaa Parish, Hiiu County, in northwestern Estonia.

References

 

Villages in Hiiu County